Fiadone (Corsican; pl. fiadoni) is a Corsican cheesecake without bottom layer, made of brocciu, sugar, lemon zest and eggs. The Fiadone can have round or rectangular shape: it is baked in oven and served cold.

In the Italian regions of Abruzzo and Molise are known as Fiadoni, fiaduni or fiauni large sweet ricotta-stuffed ravioli, served mainly at Easter.

References

Sources

See also
Flaó
Flaouna

External links
 Corsican cheesecake (fiadone Corse). Sbs.com.au.

Cuisine of Abruzzo
Cuisine of Molise
Italian desserts
Corsican desserts